Follafoss Church is a parish church of the Church of Norway in the Steinkjer municipality in Trøndelag county, Norway. It is located in the village of Follafoss. It is the church for the Verran parish, which is part of the Stiklestad prosti (deanery) in the Diocese of Nidaros. The brown, wooden church was built in a long church style in 1954 using plans drawn up by the architect Sverre Olsen. The church seats about 200 people. It has a somewhat non-traditional roof line and design due to being built on the side of a hill.

See also
List of churches in Nidaros

References

Steinkjer
Churches in Trøndelag
Long churches in Norway
Wooden churches in Norway
20th-century Church of Norway church buildings
Churches completed in 1954
1954 establishments in Norway